Engel & Völkers AG is a privately owned German company that, via a series of franchised offices, provides services related to real estate transactions.

Engel & Völkers was founded under the name Engel & Cie in 1977 in Hamburg, Germany. The company has expanded primarily through a franchise system.

The firm has around 520 residential property offices and 49 commercial offices brokering retail, office and industrial space, investment properties, multi-purpose apartment and office blocks and property portfolios.

History

Founding and structure 
In 1977, Dirk Engel set up his own business as a real estate agent in Hamburg. He took advantage of an exclusive partnership with a U.S. brokerage firm to build up his business. In 1981, Christian Völkers joined the company as a managing partner. Dirk Engel and Christian Völkers had been friends since their youth. After Engel died in 1986, Völkers took over his partner's shares and continued Engel & Cie. under the name Engel & Völkers. He also expanded the portfolio to include commercial properties in addition to residential properties and founded the "Grund Genug Verlag" publishing house, which publishes the GG magazine. Besides, the training and continuing education of real estate agents were professionalized.

Opening the business model 
In 1990, Engel & Völkers opened its first location outside Germany in Palma de Mallorca.  From then on, independent brokers could operate as licensed partners under the Engel & Völkers brand. In the run-up to the introduction of the franchise system in 1998, the entire external appearance of Engel & Völkers' stores was standardized in 1995. The company's own brand was also standardized.

Internationalization and diversification 
Engel & Völkers has been operating as a stock corporation since 1999. The company wanted to be "the first German real estate broker" to go public, but postponed this plan indefinitely after the dot-com bubble burst. Instead, it focused on internationalizing its business and opened its first office outside Europe in South Africa in 2001. Other countries followed, including the United States with the signing of a master license agreement in 2006. Greater public attention was given to the opening of a dedicated office in New York City in 2014.

At the end of the 2000s, Engel & Völkers expanded from the premium to the luxury segment. The new Private Office division targeted above-average wealthy private and business clients. The company also entered the yacht brokerage business. This offering has since been supplemented by other offerings, such as the company's polo school. Engel & Völkers has been operating it together with car manufacturer Land Rover since 2014. Polo courses are held in Hamburg, Frankfurt and Munich, as well as in Mallorca and Argentina.

In 2012, Engel & Völkers surpassed the mark of 500 locations worldwide for the first time. It has set up offices in Madrid, Rome and Paris.

Opening up new business areas 
In 2014, Sven Odia was appointed co-chairman of the management board of Engel & Völkers. He had already been a member of the company's management since 2006 and filled the new position jointly with Christian Völkers. In 2020, Völkers moved to the Supervisory Board, so that Odia now heads the Management Board alone. Völkers continues to look after strategic issues as chairman of the supervisory board and is a major shareholder. He pushed the development of new business areas, for example by founding new companies, such as for the brokerage of real estate financing. The portfolio is being expanded with offerings such as a crowd investing platform for real estate. The company is now also active in the partial sale of real estate ("Liquid Home") through a licensed company.

Engel & Völkers growth trajectory recently led to double-digit revenue growth. During the global COVID-19 pandemic, demand for high-quality real estate continued. The company is meeting this with virtual tours, for example. A renaissance of the suburbs is expected in the coming years.

In 2020, the Engel & Völkers attracted criticism for the failed real estate investments of its franchise firms. These firms, operating under the Engel & Völkers brand, used Engel & Völkers' reputation to attract investors for projects in Dubai and Nova Scotia. The franchisor rejected calls to accept responsibility for the franchisees' investments, describing them as financially and legally independent.

References

External links

California Department of Corporations UFOC document
"E&V faces new suits from U.S. brokers". The Real Deal. 15 June 2011. Retrieved 16 January 2016.

Real estate companies of Germany
Privately held companies of Germany
Real estate companies established in 1977
Franchises
Real estate companies of the United States
Companies based in Hamburg
Private equity portfolio companies